Ali André Mécili, born in 1940 in Koléa, Algeria, died assassinated in Paris on April 7, 1987, was an Algerian politician and French citizen.

Early in the Algerian liberation war, Mécili was one of the heads of the intelligence services of the NLA. After independence, he participated in the creation of the Front des forces socialistes and in its action in favor of political pluralism in Algeria. Imprisoned, then immigrated to France, he became a lawyer there and resumed political activity alongside Hocine Aït Ahmed. Decisive to bringing together the different factions of the Algerian opposition, he occupied a crucial position between them at the time of his death.

His assassination created the starting point of the Mécili affair, where the prolonged stagnation of the investigation was denounced by his relatives and certain journalists as the effect of a collusion of Algerian and French reasons of state. His studies lead the boy from Boufarik College to Ben Aknoun high school, where he joined the FLN cell. The small farm acquired by his parents in Chaïba was a refuge for the maquisards1 and the young Mécili was quickly involved in liaison tasks and providing safe places. For his comrades, he chose to be named Ali.

Biography

From 1940 to 1960, in colonial Algeria 
André Mécili was born at the end of 1940. His parents were of Kabyle ethnic minority living in Koléa, in the Algerian Sahel. His father, originally from Djemâa Saharidj, was a rural custodian, his mother postmaster. They had acquired French nationality by naturalization: he himself achieved it by birth, by descent.

His studies lead the boy from Boufarik College to Ben Aknoun high school, where he joined the FLN cell. The small farm acquired by his parents in Chaïba was a refuge for the maquisards and the young Mécili was quickly involved in liaison tasks and providing safe places. For his comrades, he chose to be named Ali.

References 

People of the Algerian War
Algerian intelligence agency personnel
Human rights activists
Sciences Po Aix alumni
Kabyle people
Berber people
1940 births
1987 deaths